Chenar Mishavan (also Romanized as Chenār Mīshavān; also known as Chenār Mashavān, Chenār Mishāūn, Chenār Mīshūn, and Mīshavān) is a village in Siyakh Darengun Rural District, in the Central District of Shiraz County, Fars Province, Iran. At the 2006 census, its population was 683, in 153 families.

References 

Populated places in Shiraz County